CQF may refer to:

 the IATA code for Calais–Dunkerque Airport
 Conference quarter final in hockey and other sports
Certificate in Quantitative Finance